Anakiwa is a coastal residential village in the Marlborough region of New Zealand. At the 2018 census, the village had a usual resident population of 171.

Anakiwa is also the terminus of the Queen Charlotte Track, with most hikers choosing to complete their walk here, before catching a water taxi back to Picton.

History
Anakiwa had long been a Māori settlement, most recently occupied by members of the Ngāti Rāhiri hapū of Te Āti Awa iwi until 1859 when they returned to Taranaki, at least in part to fight in the First Taranaki War. In earlier centuries, the Ngai Tara iwi had influence over the area. It was included in the New Zealand Company's deed of purchase in 1839, though there is doubt that the chiefs of the region understood the document or that it was correctly translated.

In 1864, the New Zealand Government granted land to the Beauchamp family for farming in Anakiwa. In 1928 the family built a guesthouse on the site, which was purchased with donated funds by Hamish Thomas as the site for Outward Bound New Zealand. It was opened as "The Cobham Outward Bound School" in 1962 by Governor-General Lord Cobham.

Tirimoana is a settlement within Anakiwa which was originally known as the Tirimoana Subdivision of the farm lands that once occupied the area to the south and west of Outward Bound School.

Boundary Gate Corner which is 3.25 kilometres from the Queen Charlotte Drive intersection, marked the boundary between the two farms in the early 1900s, and a gate once stood here across the access road.
Today, there is a sign and bench seat which marks this location.

Demographics 
It is part of the wider Marlborough Sounds East statistical area.

The Anakiwa settlement had a population of 171 at the 2018 New Zealand census, a decrease of 9 people (-5.0%) since the 2013 census, and a decrease of 12 people (-6.6%) since the 2006 census. There were 84 households. There were 78 males and 93 females, giving a sex ratio of 0.84 males per female. The median age was 58.4 years (compared with 37.4 years nationally), with 9 people (5.3%) aged under 15 years, 24 (14.0%) aged 15 to 29, 69 (40.4%) aged 30 to 64, and 69 (40.4%) aged 65 or older.

Ethnicities were 96.5% European/Pākehā, 7.0% Māori, 1.8% Asian, and 1.8% other ethnicities (totals add to more than 100% since people could identify with multiple ethnicities).

Although some people objected to giving their religion, 61.4% had no religion, and 29.8% were Christian.

Of those at least 15 years old, 45 (27.8%) people had a bachelor or higher degree, and 18 (11.1%) people had no formal qualifications. The median income was $24,700, compared with $31,800 nationally. The employment status of those at least 15 was that 66 (40.7%) people were employed full-time, 24 (14.8%) were part-time, and 3 (1.9%) were unemployed.

Marlborough Sounds East

Marlborough Sounds East had a population of 1,923 at the 2018 New Zealand census, a decrease of 30 people (-1.5%) since the 2013 census, and a decrease of 120 people (-5.9%) since the 2006 census. There were 825 households. There were 978 males and 945 females, giving a sex ratio of 1.03 males per female. The median age was 54.8 years (compared with 37.4 years nationally), with 231 people (12.0%) aged under 15 years, 195 (10.1%) aged 15 to 29, 939 (48.8%) aged 30 to 64, and 558 (29.0%) aged 65 or older.

Ethnicities were 93.8% European/Pākehā, 10.3% Māori, 0.9% Pacific peoples, 1.2% Asian, and 2.5% other ethnicities (totals add to more than 100% since people could identify with multiple ethnicities).

The proportion of people born overseas was 19.3%, compared with 27.1% nationally.

Although some people objected to giving their religion, 57.4% had no religion, 32.0% were Christian, 0.2% were Hindu, 0.5% were Buddhist and 1.6% had other religions.

Of those at least 15 years old, 300 (17.7%) people had a bachelor or higher degree, and 324 (19.1%) people had no formal qualifications. The median income was $29,000, compared with $31,800 nationally. The employment status of those at least 15 was that 729 (43.1%) people were employed full-time, 306 (18.1%) were part-time, and 33 (2.0%) were unemployed.

Services

Anakiwa has two public wharves, each with a public boat ramp. There are a total of 5 publicly accessible boat ramps along the Anakiwa foreshore.
There are numerous lodges, backpacker, and bed & breakfast accommodation within the village, as well as a seasonal store which caters to Queen Charlotte track hikers, as well as other visitors.
Public toilets are located metres from the entrance to the Queen Charlotte track, along with a payphone in a small kiosk shelter.

Other nearby services, within a 7 km radius, in the Linkwater valley include a Challenge Petrol station & store; camping ground with cabins; motel; primary school; community hall; and a rural fire station.

References

Populated places in the Marlborough Region
Marlborough Sounds
Outdoor education organizations
Populated places in the Marlborough Sounds